Coleophora protecta is a moth of the family Coleophoridae.

References

propinquoides
Moths described in 1994